Mass Country (stylized MASS COUNTRY), is the fourth studio album by South African rapper AKA. It was released posthumously by Sony and Vth A on 24 February 2023.  It was preceeded by four singles "Lemons (Lemonade)", "Prada",  "Paradise" and "Company", with guest appearances from Nasty C, KDDO, Thato Saul, Khuli Chana, Blxckie, Gyakie, Nadia Nakai, Sjava and others.

Background 
It is the final album recorded by AKA shortly before his murder in February 2023. The album was promoted on the rapper's official Instagram account hours before his shooting. The first few singles received positive reactions from producers like Swizz Beatz and Diplo.

Subsequent to the rapper's death, the album went on to top the iTunes charts, peaking at number 1 before it was released. AKA worked on Mass Country for two years.

Commercial performance 
The album surpassed 10 million streams on Spotify in less than 8 hours, becoming his most streamed album.

Artwork 
AKA revealed the album's artwork on January 11, 2023 on his Instagram account. The artwork was designed by South African illustrator Karabo Poppy. It shows the face of AKA surrounded by objects which represent South  African Culture, like a 10 cent coin, an old BMW, a skull, and a snake.

Title 
In an interview with Slikour, AKA revealed that the album's title is inspired by a South African  cultural music genre called Maskandi, citing that the title "MASS COUNTRY" sounds like "Maskandi". 

Thus the link between the title of the album and its artwork are about South African Culture, as particular objects that represent the culture appear.

Track listing

Certifications and sales

Release history

References 

2023 albums
Sony Music albums
AKA (rapper)
Albums published posthumously